Distant Lights is a 1987 Italian science fiction-thriller film written and directed by Aurelio Chiesa. It is based on the Giuseppe Pederiali's novel Venivano dalle stelle (They came from the stars).

Cast
Tomas Milian: Bernardo Bernardi
Laura Morante: Renata 
William Berger: Dr. Montanari
Giacomo Piperno: Chief of Police 
Susanna Martinkova: Silvia Bernardi 
Clara Colosimo

References

External links

1987 films
1980s Italian-language films
Italian science fiction thriller films
1980s science fiction thriller films
1980s Italian films